Here is an overview of the teams which took part at the 2005 Rugby World Cup Sevens.

Pool A

Coach: Gordon Tietjens

 Edwin Cocker 
 George Naoupu
 Tanerau Latimer
 Josh Blackie 
 Amasio Valence 
 Liam Messam (c)
 Tamati Ellison
 Tafai Ioasa
 Rudi Wulf
 Orene Ai'i 
 Isaia Toeava
 Lifeimi Mafi

Coach: Rob Moffat
 Mark Lee
 David Gray (c)
 Alasdair Strokosch
 Kelly Brown
 Ollie Brown 
 Kenny Sinclair
 Andrew Turnbull 
 Colin Gregor 
 Jamie Blackwood 
 Roland Reid 
 Clark Laidlaw 
 Calum MacRae

Todd Clever
 Alex Magleby
 Kevin Whitcher
 Mose Timoteo
 David Fee (c)
 Phillip Eloff
 Riaan van Zyl
 Riaan Hamilton
 Justin Stencel
 Mike Palefau
 Jason Raven
 Jone Naqica

Mark Bruce
 Kevin Croke
 David Hewitt 
 Tomás O'Leary 
 Ian Humphreys 
 Andew Maxwell
 Michael McComish
 Martin McPhail
 James Norton
 Brendon O'Connor
 Niall Roman
 Brian Tuohy

Park Kwang Soo
 Yoo Min-Suk
 Lee Kwang-Moon
 You Young-Nam
 Chae Jae-Young
 Chun Jong- Man
 Kwak Chul-Woong
 Kim Keun-Hyun
 Yang Young-Hun
 Yong Hwan-Myung
 Kim Hyung-Ki
 Park Chang-Min

Manako Tonga
 Joseph Kolokihakaufisi
 Tevita Fifita
 Teu'imuli Kaufusi
 Sitaleki Mafile'o
 Ofa Misa
 Sikuti Vunipola
 Siale Lolohea
 Tevita Tu'ifua
 Andrew Ma'ilei
 Sione Langatau
 Kiniconi Bakewa

Pool B

Coach: Mike Friday
 Geoff Appleford
 Tony Roques
 Pat Sanderson
 Peter Richards
 Henry Paul
 Neil Starling
 Ugo Monye
 Phil Dowson
 Rob Thirlby
 Ben Gollings
 Simon Amor (c)
 Richard Haughton

Vincent Forgues
 Martial Molinier
 Julien Carraud
 Brice Salobert
 Patrick Bosque
 Renaud Dulin
 Yohan Dalla Riva
 Laurent Ferrères
 Rida Jahouer
 Jérôme Naves
 Cédric Desbrosse
 Julien Malzieu

Giorgi Kacharava
 Vasil Katsadze
 Irakli Gundishvili
 Lasha Pirpilashvili
 Badri Khekhelashvili
 Tedore Zibzibadze
 Grigol Labadze
 Lekso Gugava
 Irakli Abuseridze
 Elguja Iovadze
 Archil Kartarashvili
 Irakli Machkhaneli

Coach:  John Schuster
 Lome Fa'atau
 Sailosi Tagicakibau
 Paul Perez
 Junior Leota
 Kiri Mariner
 Gaolo Elisara
 Apoua Stewart
 Brian Lima
 Uale Mai
 Samu Eteuati
 Mark Tanuvasa
 David Lemi

Hsieh Cheng-Chung
 Wu Chih-Wei
 Huang Han-Yang
 Pan Chih-Ming
 Chang Weh-Cheng
 Wang Kuo-Feng
 Tung Yuan-Hsiang
 Sun Cheng-Yen
 Chen Chi-Chung
 Wu Chih-Whsien
 Chen Chih-Fei
 Chang Chun-Ming

Steven Bortolussi
 Javier Dragotto
 Nicola Leonardi
 Alvaro López González
 Pablo Canavosio
 Jacob Gaina
 Emiliano Mulieri
 Tomás Pucciariello
 Benjamin de Jager
 Ezio Galon
 Antonio Mannato
 Luca Martin (c)

Pool C

Coach:  Wayne Pivac
 Semisi Naevo
 Apolosi Satala
 Viliame Satala
 Ifereimi Rawaqa
 Jone Daunivucu
 Waisale Serevi (c)
 Vilimoni Delasau
 Marika Vunibaka
 Nasoni Roko
 William Ryder
 Sireli Bobo
 Neumi Nanuku

Coach: Glen Ella
 Luke Inman
 Matt Hodgson
 Keiran Massey
 Tim Clark (c)
 James Morgan
 Andrew Brown
 Nick Reily
 Josh Gamgee
 James Su'a
 Anthony Sauer
 Shawn Mackay
 Kacey Mitchell

Coach: Kazuhiko Honjo
 Tomohiro Yamaguchi
 Kilive Naloli
 Katoni Otukolo
 Takashi Kikutani
 Eiji Yamamoto
 Kiyonori Tanaka
 Nathan Ashley
 Yusuke Kobuki
 Ryohei Miki
 Go Aruga
 Hirotoki Onozawa
 Yohei Shinomiya

Coach:  Daniel Hourcade

 Vasco Uva
 Diogo Mateus
 Martim Tomé
 Antonio Pinto
 Filipe Grenho
 Miguel Morais
 Pedro Carvalho
 Diogo Coutinho
 Frederico Sousa
 Pedro Leal
 Antonio de Aguilar
 Nuno Carvalho

Coach: Ric Suggitt
 Marco Di Girolamo (c)
 Ed Fairhurst
 Christoph Strubin
 Ryan Smith
 Quentin Fyffe
 Matt King
 Derek Daypuck
 Stirling Richmond
 Brodie Henderson
 Mike Danskin
 Dave Moonlight
 Justin Mensah-Coker

Coach: Ian Torpey
 Paul Dingley
 Paul Gaffney
 Kris Marin
 Warren Warner
 Andrew Wong Kee
 Andrew Chambers
 Rowan Varty
 Nigel D'Acre
 Robert Naylor
 Ricky Cheuk
 Paul Morehu
 Alexander Gibbs
Injured: Tim O'Connor

Pool D

Coach: Paul Treu
 Tobela Mdaka
 Stefen Basson
 Jano Vermaak
 Lesley Jackson
 Schalk van der Merwe
 Danwell Demas
 Gareth Krause
 Eddie Fredericks
 Mzwandile Stick
 Fabian Juries
 Marius Schoeman
 Jaco Pretorius

Head Coach: Hernán Rouco Oliva

 Juan Martín Berberián (San Isidro Club)
 Francisco Bosch (Hindu Club)
 Lucas Borges (Pucará)
 Juan Martín Fernández Lobbe (Liceo Naval)
 Santiago Gómez Cora (Lomas Athletic)
 Francisco Leonelli (La Tablada) (C)
 Fernando Higgs (Los Tordos)
 Lucio López Fleming (San Isidro Club)
 Federico Martín Aramburú (Biarritz)
 Andrés Romagnoli (San Fernando)
 Martín Schusterman (Plymouth Albion)
 Federico Serra Miras (San Isidro Club)

Khaled Zegdene
 Mohamed Yousri Souguir
 Slah Blagui
 Mohamed Ali Naouali
 Sabeur Ben Charrada
 Kais Issa
 Lofti Ben Msallem
 Abess Kherfani
 Majdi Guirrat
 Sabri Guemir
 Amor Mezgar
 Haithem Chelly

Vladislav Korshunov
 Alexey Panasenko
 Sergey Trishin
 Igor Klyuchnikov
 Vladimir Simonov
 Pavel Novikov
 Andrei Kuzin
 Alexander Yanyuskin
 Viktor Motorin
 Yuri Kushnarev
 Sergey Kuzmenko
 Andrei Chaliouta

Felix Clement Ochieng
 Peter Claver Abuoga
 Edwin Shimenga
 Victor Sudi Simiyu
 Leslie Mango
 Allan Makaka
 Oscar Osir Osula (C)
 Benjamin Ayimba
 Sidney Ashioya
 Lucas Onyango
 Newton Ongalo
 Peter Ocholla

Marcelo Gutiérrez
 Ignacio Conti
 Nicolas Brignoni
 Alfredo Delgado
 Santiago Alfaro
 Juan Beyhaut
 Agustín Pérez del Castillo
 Juan Baldomir
 Matías Arocena
 Agustín Pereira
 Joaquín Pastore
 Juan Campomar

References

Rugby World Cup Sevens squads